Curtis Lionell Blaydes (born February 18, 1991) is an American professional mixed martial artist. He currently competes in the Heavyweight division in the Ultimate Fighting Championship (UFC). A professional since 2014, Blaydes formerly competed for the Resurrection Fighting Alliance (RFA). As of December 6, 2022, he is #4 in the UFC heavyweight rankings.

Background
Blaydes was born in Naperville, Illinois, and raised in nearby Chicago along with his four other siblings. He began wrestling for the De La Salle Institute, winning a state title his senior year while also compiling an undefeated 44–0 record. During his four years, Blaydes compiled an overall record of 95–18 with 121 takedowns. Blaydes also played football for De La Salle as a defensive end. He later earned a full wrestling scholarship to Northern Illinois University. After going 19–2 as a redshirt freshman at NIU, he transferred to Harper College. At Harper, Blaydes won the NJCAA National Championship as a redshirt sophomore. After he began fighting in amateur mixed martial arts, Blaydes left school to focus on a career in MMA.

Blaydes was an IKF amateur champion.

Mixed martial arts career

Early career
Blaydes compiled an 8–0 amateur record before turning professional in 2014. He then went 5–0, with all wins via TKO, before being signed by the UFC.

Ultimate Fighting Championship
Blaydes made his promotional debut against Francis Ngannou on April 10, 2016, at UFC Fight Night 86. He lost the fight via TKO at the conclusion of the second round due to doctor stoppage.

Blaydes next faced Cody East on October 1, 2016, at UFC Fight Night 96. He won the fight via TKO in the second round, winning his first UFC Performance of the Night bonus.

Blaydes faced Adam Milstead on February 4, 2017, at UFC Fight Night 104. After dominating the action throughout the first round, Blaydes won the fight via TKO after Milstead sustained a knee injury. Subsequently, the result was changed to a No Contest after Blaydes tested positive for marijuana.

Blaydes faced Daniel Omielańczuk on July 8, 2017, at UFC 213. He won the fight by unanimous decision.

Blaydes faced Alexey Oleynik on November 4, 2017, at UFC 217. He won the fight via TKO due to a doctor stoppage. The referee stopped the fight after Blaydes delivered an illegal kick to a downed opponent and called a doctor to check on Oliynyk. The fight was stopped due to the doctor's advice. The replay, however, showed the strike did not deliver significant damage (as it only grazed the ear), and the fight was ruled a win for Blaydes.

Blaydes faced Mark Hunt on February 11, 2018, at UFC 221. He won the fight via unanimous decision.

Blaydes faced Alistair Overeem on June 9, 2018, at UFC 225. He won the fight via TKO due to elbows in the third round. This win earned him the Performance of the Night bonus.

Blaydes faced Francis Ngannou in a rematch on November 24, 2018, in the main event at UFC Fight Night 141 He lost the fight via TKO early into the first round.

Blaydes faced Justin Willis on March 23, 2019, at UFC Fight Night 148. Blaydes continually took Willis down, scoring multiple takedowns and knocking down Willis in the second round winning the fight via unanimous decision.

Blaydes faced Shamil Abdurakhimov on September 7, 2019, at UFC 242. He won the fight via TKO in the second round.

Blaydes faced Junior dos Santos on January 25, 2020, at UFC Fight Night 166. He won the fight via technical knockout in the second round.

Blaydes faced Alexander Volkov on June 20, 2020, at UFC Fight Night: Blaydes vs. Volkov. He won the fight via unanimous decision (49–46, 48–47, and 48–46).

Blaydes was scheduled to face Derrick Lewis on November 28, 2020, at UFC on ESPN: Blaydes vs. Lewis. However, he tested positive for coronavirus and thus, the bout was scrapped. The pair was rescheduled for UFC Fight Night 185 on February 20, 2021. Blaydes lost the fight via knockout in the second round. He became a free agent after fighting out his contract, and signed a new four-fight deal with the UFC in May.

Blaydes faced Jairzinho Rozenstruik on September 25, 2021, at UFC 266. Blaydes won the fight via unanimous decision.

Blaydes faced Chris Daukaus on March 26, 2022, at UFC on ESPN 33. He won the fight via TKO early in the second round. The win also earned him the Performance of the Night award.

Blaydes faced Tom Aspinall on July 23, 2022, at UFC Fight Night 208. Blaydes won the fight via TKO after Aspinall suffered a knee injury and was unable to defend himself in the opening minute of the fight.

Blayde is scheduled to face Sergei Pavlovich on April 22, 2023, at UFC Fight Night 222.

Personal life
Blaydes has a daughter, Harlie, from a previous relationship.

Championships and accomplishments

Mixed martial arts
Ultimate Fighting Championship
 Performance of the Night (Three times) vs. Cody East, Alistair Overeem, and Chris Daukaus
Most takedowns in a fight in UFC Heavyweight division history (14)

Folkstyle wrestling
National Junior College Athletic Association
NJCAA HWT National Championship out of Harper College  (2012)
NJCAA All-American out of Harper College  (2012)

Mixed martial arts record

|-
|Win
|align=center|17–3 (1)
|Tom Aspinall
|TKO (knee injury)
|UFC Fight Night: Blaydes vs. Aspinall 
|
|align=center|1
|align=center|0:15
|London, England
|
|-
|Win
|align=center|16–3 (1)
|Chris Daukaus
|TKO (punches)
|UFC on ESPN: Blaydes vs. Daukaus
|
|align=center|2
|align=center|0:17
|Columbus, Ohio, United States
|
|-
|Win
|align=center|15–3 (1)
|Jairzinho Rozenstruik
|Decision (unanimous)
|UFC 266
|
|align=center|3
|align=center|5:00
|Las Vegas, Nevada, United States
|
|-
|Loss
|align=center|14–3 (1)
|Derrick Lewis
|KO (punch)
|UFC Fight Night: Blaydes vs. Lewis
|
|align=center|2
|align=center|1:26
|Las Vegas, Nevada, United States
|
|-
|Win
|align=center|14–2 (1)
|Alexander Volkov
|Decision (unanimous)
|UFC on ESPN: Blaydes vs. Volkov
|
|align=center|5
|align=center|5:00
|Las Vegas, Nevada, United States
|
|-
|Win
|align=center|13–2 (1)
|Junior dos Santos
|TKO (punches)
|UFC Fight Night: Blaydes vs. dos Santos
|
|align=center|2
|align=center|1:06
|Raleigh, North Carolina, United States
|
|-
|Win
|align=center|12–2 (1)
|Shamil Abdurakhimov
|TKO (elbow and punch)
|UFC 242
|
|align=center|2
|align=center|2:22
|Abu Dhabi, United Arab Emirates
|
|-
|Win
|align=center|11–2 (1)
|Justin Willis
|Decision (unanimous)
|UFC Fight Night: Thompson vs. Pettis
|
|align=center|3
|align=center|5:00
|Nashville, Tennessee, United States
|
|-
|Loss
|align=center|10–2 (1)
|Francis Ngannou
|TKO (punches)
|UFC Fight Night: Blaydes vs. Ngannou 2
|
|align=center|1
|align=center|0:45
|Beijing, China
|
|-
|Win
|align=center|10–1 (1)
|Alistair Overeem
|TKO (elbows)
|UFC 225
|
|align=center|3
|align=center|2:56
|Chicago, Illinois, United States
|
|-
|Win
|align=center|9–1 (1)
|Mark Hunt
|Decision (unanimous)
|UFC 221
|
|align=center|3
|align=center|5:00
|Perth, Australia
|
|-
|Win
|align=center|8–1 (1)
|Alexey Oleynik
|TKO (doctor stoppage)
|UFC 217
|
|align=center|2
|align=center|1:56
|New York City, New York, United States
|
|-
|Win
|align=center|7–1 (1)
|Daniel Omielańczuk
|Decision (unanimous)
|UFC 213
|
|align=center|3
|align=center|5:00
|Las Vegas, Nevada, United States
|
|-
|NC
|align=center|6–1 (1)
|Adam Milstead
|NC (overturned)
|UFC Fight Night: Bermudez vs. The Korean Zombie
|
|align=center|2
|align=center|0:59
|Houston, Texas, United States
|
|-
|Win
|align=center|6–1
|Cody East
|TKO (elbows)
|UFC Fight Night: Lineker vs. Dodson
|
|align=center|2
|align=center|2:02
|Portland, Oregon, United States
|
|-
|Loss
|align=center|5–1
|Francis Ngannou
|TKO (doctor stoppage)
|UFC Fight Night: Rothwell vs. dos Santos
|
|align=center|2
|align=center|5:00
|Zagreb, Croatia
|
|-
|Win
|align=center|5–0
|Luis Cortez
|TKO (punches)
|RFA 35: Moises vs. Castillo
|
|align=center|3
|align=center|0:41
|Orem, Utah, United States
|
|-
|Win
|align=center|4–0
|Allen Crowder
|TKO (punches)
|RDMMA: Battle in the South 10
|
|align=center|2
|align=center|N/A
|Wilmington, North Carolina, United States
|
|-
|Win
|align=center|3–0
|Brad Faylor
|TKO (punches)
|SCS 23: Redemption
|
|align=center|2
|align=center|0:45
|Hinton, Oklahoma, United States
|
|-
|Win
|align=center|2–0
|William Baptiste
|TKO (punches)
|XFO 53
|
|align=center|1
|align=center|2:14
|Chicago, Illinois, United States
|
|-
|Win
|align=center|1–0
|Lorenzo Hood
|TKO (doctor stoppage)
|XFO 51
|
|align=center|1
|align=center|1:42
|Chicago, Illinois, United States 
|
|-

Amateur mixed martial arts record

|-
|Win
|align=center| 5–0
|Tyler Reece
|Submission (arm-triangle choke)
|XFO Fight NIght
|February 21, 2014
|align=center|1
|align=center|0:24
|Arlington Heights, Illinois, United States
|
|-
|Win
|align=center| 4–0
|Anthony Harvey 
|Decision (unanimous)
|Brawl at the Hall 10
|November 15, 2013
|align=center|3
|align=center|5:00
|Joliet, Illinois, United States
|
|-
|Win
|align=center| 3–0
|Pete Juska 
|TKO (punches)
|AFPC 13 - Summer Brawl
|July 13, 2013
|align=center|1
|align=center|2:16
|Villa Park, Illinois, United States
|
|-
|Win
|align=center| 2–0
|Angel Cabral 
|TKO (punches)
|Brawl at the Hall
|June 7, 2013
|align=center|1
|align=center|2:16
|Joliet, Illinois, United States
|
|-
|Win
|align=center| 1–0
|Robbie Strong
|TKO (punches)
|No Mercy 2012
|September 29, 2012
|align=center|1
|align=center|0:13
|Melrose Park, Illinois, United States
|
|-
|}

See also
List of male mixed martial artists
List of current UFC fighters

References

External links
 
 

1991 births
American male mixed martial artists
African-American mixed martial artists
Mixed martial artists from Illinois
Heavyweight mixed martial artists
Mixed martial artists utilizing collegiate wrestling
Mixed martial artists utilizing kickboxing
Mixed martial artists utilizing Brazilian jiu-jitsu
Ultimate Fighting Championship male fighters
Doping cases in mixed martial arts
American male kickboxers
Kickboxers from Illinois
American practitioners of Brazilian jiu-jitsu
American male sport wrestlers
Amateur wrestlers
Sportspeople from Chicago
Sportspeople from Naperville, Illinois
21st-century African-American sportspeople
Living people